Alastair McHarg (born 17 June 1944) is a former Scotland international rugby union player. He played at Lock for the national side between 1968 and 1979.

Rugby Union career

Amateur career

Like Ian McLauchlan and Gordon Brown who were his contemporaries, McHarg was an Ayrshire man.

McHarg played for Irvine since his local club's formation in 1962, before going on to play for West of Scotland and London Scottish.

He trained and very occasionally played for Sidmouth RFC when not in use by Scottish.

Provincial career

McHarg played for Anglo-Scots and captained the side.

He also played for Surrey.

International career

McHarg won 44 caps for Scotland and also frequently partnered Gordon Brown in the Scottish second row.

Richard Bath writes of him that:
"At just over 15 stone and just 6ft. 4in., Alastair McHarg was hardly the identikit second row forward, even in the days when they didn't exactly breed 'em huge... A tough and notoriously abrasive Glaswegian, McHarg once joked that his entire playing career was shrouded 'in red mist'. McHarg though, fails to do himself justice with that remark... His speed around the park was perfectly suited to the mobile rucking game played by the Scots, whilst his timing and nous made him a safe bet at the line-out and one of the best number two jumpers of his generation."

Allan Massie says,
"He was probably the best line-out player Scotland have had. He timed his jump beautifully and could out-leap most of his contemporaries." – but was never selected for Lions.

Massie also valued his entertainment value as much as his skill.
"[o]f the famous Scottish front five of the early Seventies, Alastair McHarg was the card, the character, the most unorthodox, the greatest fun to watch. He was tall and rangy, a buoyant athlete, a little on the light side for a modern lock... His value in the broken play was incalculable."

Despite his skills, there were those who thought that McHarg would have been better as a Number 8.

Administrative career

McHarg has been the Director of Rugby at Reading since 2005.

Coaching career

He coached at Sidmouth RFC.

Business career

Alastair still helps run his family business, Anglo Agriparts, selling Massey Ferguson, Ford New Holland, John Deere, David Brown, Fiat and Case IH classic tractor parts online.

References

Sources

 Bath, Richard (ed.) The Complete Book of Rugby (Seven Oaks Ltd, 1997 )
 Massie, Allan A Portrait of Scottish Rugby (Polygon, Edinburgh)

External links
Alastair McHarg – tribute by the Scotsman newspaper

Sporting Heroes profile

1944 births
Living people
London Scottish F.C. players
People educated at Irvine Royal Academy
Rugby union locks
Rugby union players from Irvine, North Ayrshire
Scotland international rugby union players
Scottish rugby union coaches
Scottish rugby union players
Surrey RFU players
West of Scotland FC players